The Palmar River is a river of Venezuela. It drains into Lake Maracaibo.

The Palmar River rises in the Serranía del Perijá.
In its lower reaches it flows through an area of the Catatumbo moist forests ecoregion.
It then flows through the Maracaibo dry forests ecoregion before emptying into Lake Maracaibo.

See also
List of rivers of Venezuela

References

Rivers of Venezuela